William Rudolph Stephen Feilding, 10th Earl of Denbigh, 9th Earl of Desmond (17 April 1912 – 31 December 1966), was the son of Rudolph Feilding, Viscount Feilding, and Agnes Imelda Mary Harding. He was educated at The Oratory School when still based in Edgbaston. He fought in the Second World War where he gained the rank of captain in the service of the Coldstream Guards. He held the office of J.P. for Warwickshire. He died in 1966 at the age of 54.

He was the father of Rollo Feilding, 11th Earl of Denbigh and erotic artist Willy Feilding.

References

1912 births
1966 deaths
People educated at The Oratory School
Place of birth missing
British Army personnel of World War II
Earls of Denbigh
Coldstream Guards officers
Desmond, William Feilding, 9th Earl of
20th-century English nobility